Lieutenant-Colonel Sir Septimus Robinson (30 January 1710 – 6 September 1765) was a British Army officer who became Gentleman Usher of the Black Rod.

Career
Educated at Westminster School and Christ Church, Oxford, Robinson joined the French Army in 1731 and fought in Flanders. He later fought for the British Army during the Jacobite Rising of 1745 and subsequently in Flanders under Generals Wade and Ligonier. He retired from the Army in 1754 and served as Governor to the brothers of King George III before becoming Gentleman Usher of the Black Rod. He was knighted on 10 April 1761.

He is buried at Rokeby Park in County Durham.

References

1710 births
1765 deaths
People educated at Westminster School, London
Alumni of Christ Church, Oxford
British Army officers
Knights Bachelor
Ushers of the Black Rod